Understanding Physics (1966) is a popular science book written by Isaac Asimov (1920-1992). It is considered to be a reader-friendly informational guide regarding the fields of physics, written for lay people. It is one of several science guides by Asimov.

The book is divided into three volumes, each of which have also been published separately as books. They are:

Volume I: Motion, Sound, and Heat
Volume II: Light, Magnetism, and Electricity
Volume III: The Electron, Proton, and Neutron

Editions
Asimov, Isaac (1966), Understanding Physics, Walker and Company.
1988 reprint, New York: Buccaneer Books; .
1988 omnibus (single volume) reprint, Dorset Press; .
1993 omnibus (single volume) reprint, Barnes & Noble; .

External links
 Understanding Physics on Amazon.com

1966 non-fiction books
Books by Isaac Asimov
Popular physics books